The Redwoods is a 1967 American short documentary film produced by Trevor Greenwood and Mark Jonathan Harris. It was produced for the Sierra Club as part of their campaign for a national park to protect the redwood forest. In 1968, it won an Oscar at the 40th Academy Awards for Documentary Short Subject.

See also
List of American films of 1967

References

External links

1967 films
1967 in the environment
1967 documentary films
1967 short films
1960s short documentary films
Sierra Club
American short documentary films
Documentary films about forests and trees
Best Documentary Short Subject Academy Award winners
Sponsored films
Redwood National and State Parks
Sequoioideae
1960s English-language films
1960s American films